Mariann Bienz, Lady Pelham FRS FMedSci (born 21 December 1953, Winterthur) is a Swiss-British  molecular biologist based at the UK Medical Research Council Laboratory of Molecular Biology. She has been a member of their Senior Scientific Staff since 1991, was Joint-head of Cell Biology in 2007-08 and has been a Group Leader of Protein and Nucleic Acid Chemistry Division since 2008.

Education
She was educated at Gymnasium Winterthur and the University of Zürich where she studied Zoology and Molecular Biology and earned her PhD in 1981.

Career and research
Bienz subsequently undertook postdoctoral research at the LMB and in 1986 returned to Zürich as Assistant Professor, and then (1990) Associate Professor also serving as a member of EMBO in 1989.

Personal life
Married to biologist Sir Hugh Pelham since 1996.

Awards and honours
 Member EMBO, 1989
 Friedrich Miescher Prize, Swiss Biochemical Society, 1990
 Fellow of the Royal Society (FRS), 2003
 Fellow of the Academy of Medical Sciences (FMedSci), 2006

References

British people of Swiss descent
Swiss expatriates in England
Female Fellows of the Royal Society
University of Zurich alumni
Members of the European Molecular Biology Organization
Living people
British molecular biologists
Fellows of the Academy of Medical Sciences (United Kingdom)
Academic staff of the University of Zurich
Women molecular biologists
Wives of knights
1953 births